The Ohio Environmental Council is an environmental organization founded in 1969. Its work includes the environment, clean energy, and democracy.

Environment 
OEC praised Columbus's Climate Action Plan. OEC jointly sought action against pollution of Lake Erie and toxic algal blooms. OEC also sought to limit PFAS pollution called forever chemicals.

Clean energy 
The OEC vouched for Icebreaker wind energy off the shores of Cleveland. OEC objected to siting changes that would block solar farms. OEC called a bill permitting energy efficiency programs a good first step.

Democracy 
OEC filed an amicus brief opposing gerrymandered maps. As part of the Ohio Fair Courts Alliance, OEC encouraged voters to engage with judicial races.

References

External links 

 Ohio Environmental Council

Environmental organizations based in Ohio
Climate change organizations based in the United States
Organizations established in 1969